The 2002–03 Slovak Cup was the 34th season of Slovakia's annual knock-out cup competition and the tenth since the independence of Slovakia. It began on 10 September 2002 with Round 1 and ended on 8 May 2003 with the Final. The winners of the competition earned a place in the qualifying round of the UEFA Cup. Koba Senec were the defending champions.

First round
The match DAC Dunajská Streda – Matador Púchov was played on 10 September 2002 and the thirteen games were played on 11 September 2002 .

|}

Second round
The seven games were played on 23 September 2002 and the match ŽP Šport Podbrezová – MFK Myjava/Tura Luka was played on 10 October 2002.

|}

Quarter-finals
The games were played on 22 October 2002.

|}

Semi-finals
The first legs were played on 19 March 2003. The second legs were played on 15 and 16 April 2003.

|}

Final

References

External links
profutbal.sk 
Results on RSSSF

Slovak Cup seasons
Slovak Cup
Cup